Aireborough is a district within the West Yorkshire Urban Area, in the West Riding of Yorkshire, England.  It is mostly within the present Leeds metropolitan borough, although some areas now in Bradford metropolitan district may also be considered to form part of Aireborough. It includes the settlements of Guiseley, Hawksworth, Menston, High Royds, Nether Yeadon, Rawdon, Yeadon, West Carlton, East Carlton and Esholt.

The name Aireborough is used for a UK census ward, which was named "the most average place in England and Wales", following studies arising from the 2001 census.

Etymology
The name Aireborough was first applied to a fictional and wealthy manufacturing town, in short stories written for newspapers of the late nineteenth century by Charles Darcy Friel, who lived and worked in Leeds, and died there in 1910. The name derives from the River Aire, which intersects the West Yorkshire Urban Area.

In 1936, the urban councils of Guiseley, Yeadon and Rawdon, along with smaller settlements belonging to Wharfedale Rural District, decided to form a new autonomous Urban District Council. While the area was similar to the former civil Parish of Guiseley, the name Aireborough was instead adopted –  to reflect the equality of all townships included in the district and "wipe out old jealousies, and concentrate more readily on the problems ahead, working together as a team". On 1 April 1937, the Urban District came into being. Aireborough Urban District was subsumed by Leeds metropolitan borough under the 1974 local government reorganisation.'''

Physical characteristics
The area sits on the sandstone and millstone grit of the South Pennines, in a landscape shaped by human endeavour since ancient times.  Water in the form of becks, tarns and wetlands, is a key natural resource, mostly draining towards the River Aire.

Local stone features in the drystone walls and solid stone buildings – as well as in the foundations of the Houses of Parliament. Whilst green-ways used for travelling to church, market, mill or dispersed farmsteads still cut across the town and landscape.

History
The main townships of Guiseley, Rawdon and Yeadon grew into industrial textile and manufacturing townships from their medieval farming/weaving origins.  The smaller areas of Nether Yeadon, Carlton, and Hawksworth still retain their pre-industrial character.

Aireborough, in common with the South Pennines Heritage Area, was an important area for social developments such as: non-conformist religion (e.g. Quakers, Baptists and Methodists); co-operative movements and; 19th century philanthropists who donated public buildings and facilities, such as Jonathan Peate.

Many of the mills made fabric or supported the textile industry for national companies such as Jaeger and Marks & Spencer.  However, since 2000 most of the bigger industry has left, and Leeds Bradford International Airport, in Yeadon, is now one of the biggest employers.  There are though still some successful quality textile firms such as Abraham Moon who have survived and thrived, and a range of smaller and medium size businesses who base themselves in the area to take advantage of the setting and the local skilled labour force.

High Royds Hospital, a former psychiatric hospital at Menston, was redeveloped as housing at the beginning of the 21st century.

The name Aireborough has been used by many official bodies or organisations. Yeadon and Guiseley Secondary School was renamed Aireborough Grammar School in 1937 (when the Urban District was formed) and retained the name until its closure in 1991 – the names of the different townships emblazoned on the school frontage are now set into the stone wall opposite Nunroyd Park. The Royal Mail has an Aireborough delivery office.

Community organisations using the name include: 
Aireborough Civic Society
Aireborough Fundraising Group (Marie Curie)
Aireborough Neighbourhood Development Forum and Aireborough Historical Society
Aireborough Learning Partnership
Aireborough Extended Services 
Aireborough Voluntary Services for the Elderly
Aireborough Rugby Union Football Club
Aireborough Swimming Club
Aireborough Rifle & Revolver Club
Aireborough Bridge Club
Aireborough Camera Club
Aireborough Gilbert & Sullivan Society
Rotary Club of Aireborough
Soroptimist International Aireborough

Gallery

References

Sources

External links
Vision of Britain Aireborough Boundary Maps
Aireborough’s Natural and Built Environment Baseline Report

Places in Leeds
History of West Yorkshire
1937 establishments in England
Districts of England abolished by the Local Government Act 1972
Urban districts of England
Unparished areas in West Yorkshire